

Events
March 5-March 7 – The 6th Jakarta International Java Jazz Festival opens in Jakarta.
March 22 – Daniel Barenboim is awarded the Otto Hahn Peace Medal for his work with the West-Eastern Divan Orchestra.
August 15 - "Jiyo Utho Bado Jeeto", written by musician A. R. Rahman, is approved as the official anthem of the 2010 Commonwealth Games.
October 3 - At the opening ceremony of the Commonwealth Games in Delhi, India, musical performers include:
Drummers from Kerala, Manipur, Karnataka, Orissa, Punjab and Meghalaya, including 7-year-old tabla prodigy Keshav.
Hariharan
Dancers including Birju Maharaj, Rajkumar Singhajit Singh, Saroja Vaidyanathan, Sonal Mansingh and Bharati Shivaji

Albums
Betzefer - Freedom to the Slave Makers (Israel)
Ei Jibon Nohoi Xuna Bondhu (compilation album; India)
Jasbir Jassi - Jassi – Back with a Bang (India)
Kaela Kimura - 5 Years (Japan)
Tarkan - Adımı Kalbine Yaz (Turkey)
Haifa Wehbe - Baby Haifa (Lebanon)
Younha - Hitotsu Sora no Shita (South Korea)

Classical
Mehdi Hosseini
Taleshi Hava, for solo violin and bassoon
An Unfinished Draft, for flute, clarinet, piano, violin, violoncello and baritone
Pause, for flute, clarinet, piano, violin, violoncello and tubular bells

Opera
The Child Dreams, by Gil Shohat 
Madame White Snake, with music by Zhou Long and libretto by Cerise Lim Jacobs

Deaths
January 7 – Kamal Mahsud, Pakistani Pashto language folk singer (gas leak)
January 11 – Georgy Garanian, Armenian-Russian saxophonist, bandleader, and composer, 75
March – Farman Behboud, Iranian pianist and piano teacher, 63
March 22 – Yanie, Malaysian singer
April 22 – Fred Panopio, Filipino folk singer, 71
June 12 – Fuat Mansurov, Russian conductor, 82
July 15 – Luo Pinchao, Chinese opera singer, 98
November 2 
Rudolf Barshai, Russian violist and composer, 86
Kalim Sharafi, Bangladeshi singer, 85

See also 
 2010 in music
 2010 in Japanese music
 2010 in South Korean music
 List of 2010 albums

References 

Asia
Asian music
2010 in Asia